Jürgen Melzer was the two-time defending champion, but lost to Kevin Anderson in the quarterfinals.

No.1 seed Jo-Wilfried Tsonga won the tournament beating No. 2 seed Juan Martín del Potro in the final, 6–7(5–7), 6–3, 6–4.

Seeds
The top four seeds receive a bye into the second round.

Qualifying

Draw

Finals

Top half

Bottom half

References
 Main Draw

Singles